The 2012–13 version of the Jordan FA Cup was the 33rd edition to be played. It is the premier knockout tournament for football teams in Jordan. This season, the format had changed from a two-legged knockout competition to a group stage-based competition, similar to the 2011 Jordan FA Shield. Matches were played on a home-and-away basis.

All twelve top flight clubs took part, divided into two groups of six teams.

The cup winner is guaranteed a place in the 2014 AFC Cup.

Group stage

Group A

Group B

Al-Buqa'a come above Al-Sareeh on head-to-head record.

11th Place Match

11th-place match featured sides finishing in 6th place in the group stages

|}

9th Place Match

9th-place match featured sides finishing in 5th place in the group stages

|}

Quarter-finals
The top four teams of each group advance.

|}

Semi-finals

|}

Final

|}

References

External links
 

Jordan FA Cup seasons
Jordan
Cup